Bad Rappenau (South Franconian: Rappene) is a city municipality in the district of Heilbronn in Baden-Württemberg in southern Germany.

Geography
Bad Rappenau is situated in the northeastern Kraichgau.

Neighbouring municipalities
Neighbouring towns and villages of Bad Rappenau are (clockwise from the east): Gundelsheim, Offenau and Bad Wimpfen (all of the district of Heilbronn), Heilbronn, Massenbachhausen and Kirchardt (both of the district of Heilbronn), Sinsheim, Neckarbischofsheim and Helmstadt-Bargen (all of the Rhein-Neckar-Kreis), Hüffenhardt (Neckar-Odenwald-Kreis), Siegelsbach (district of Heilbronn) and Haßmersheim (Neckar-Odenwald-Kreis). Bad Rappenau has combined with Kirchardt and Siegelsbach to form a joint association of administrations.

Structure
The municipality consists of the town itself and the villages Babstadt, Bonfeld, Fürfeld, Grombach, Heinsheim, Obergimpern, Treschklingen, and Wollenberg.

Besides there are the hamlets Zimmerhof, Kohlhof, Maierhof, Bartsmühle, Kugelmühle, and Sommersmühle. The hamlets Oberbiegelhof and Unterbiegelhof belong to Babstadt; Eichhäuser Hof, Obere Mühle, and Untere Mühle belong to Bonfeld; Burg Ehrenberg belongs to Heinsheim; Eulenberg(er)hof, Wagenbach, Obere Mühle, and Portland-Zementwerk belong to Obergimpern; and Neumühle belongs to Wollenberg. Gone resp. non-existent villages are Niuern and Speceshart on the communal land of Rappenau, Eichhausen on the communal land of Bonfeld, und Battenhausen on the communal land of Grombach.

History
Rappenau was first mentioned documentary in 1343. According to other sources the village was previously named as Rappenheim due to its founder Rappo who was not in connection with ministerials. Presumably the settlement began around the 8th century. In the Middle Ages there were three villages near Rappenau: the upper village, the older lower village, and the no-more existent village Speßhardt, besides several hamlets.

Rappenau belonged to the Lords of Vaihingen and Württemberg until 1339, since 1344 it still only belonged to the Lords of Württemberg. The upper and lower village grew together to a united village, bordering at the Mühlbach in the south. Eberhard von Gemmingen had built a water castle in 1601. In Thirty Years' War the village burned down several times. By the German Mediatisation the village came to Baden in 1806.

After discovering a brine 175m below earth surface in 1822, there were big efforts to use the brine as a remedy. However, Baden had no interests in creating a bath in the first time. So there was founded a community to create the Sophienbad (named after grand duchess Sophie von Baden) on May 15, 1834. Soon it turned out that the bath was unable to be financed, so it had to be closed. In 1845 the brine bath was opened, further increasing its capacity. In 1862 and 1882 a steam bath and brine inhalations were added.

In 1887 the children's spa rooms were opened. In 1912 Prof. Dr. Oskar Vulpius opened a sanatorium containing 120 beds to treat bone, joint, and gland sufferings. Meanwhile, a new brine bath was built and opened in 1903. In 1921 there were around 84,500 overnight stays. The recognition of being a spa town goes back to a decree of 1930 by the ministry of Baden. Since then the municipality took the name Bad Rappenau. After World War II cure bustle increased heavily. In 1952 it has been the seventh biggest spa town in Baden. In the 1970s there were four special clinics hosting around 600,000 overnight stays.

Due to the administration reform of 1936 Bad Rappenau turned into the district of Sinsheim. On April 1, 1950, the village Zimmerhof has been incorporated into the municipality. From 1971 to 1973 eight further municipalities had been incorporated into Bad Rappenau. Due to the district reform of January 1, 1973, Bad Rappenau turned into the district of Heilbronn. This district belongs to the administrative district of Stuttgart, so a municipality previously belonging to Baden is now administrated by Württemberg. Also in 1973 the municipality got town rights. On January 1, 2003, Bad Rappenau became a Große Kreisstadt.

Religions

The area of Bad Rappenau previously belonged to the Bishopric of Worms. In 1530 the Reformation has been introduced.

After the transition to Baden in 1806, the municipality got a member of the Protestant Church of Baden. In 1887, the foundation stone of the new town church of Bad Rappenau was laid. Previously the parish belonged to the church district of Sinsheim, changing to the one of Bad Rappenau-Sinsheim in 1975. On January 1, 2005, there was a fusion with the church district of Sinsheim to the church district Kraichgau. In other villages of Bad Rappenau there are also different parishes belonging to the Protestant Parish of Baden. Only the parishes of Bonfeld and Fürfeld belong to the Protestant Parish of Württemberg, since these villages belonged to Württemberg in former times.

In the 19th century there were also Catholics moving to Bad Rappenau. Formerly they got cared by the neighbouring parish of Siegelsbach. In 1896 own services within the water castle took place. In 1929 the Herz-Jesu-Kirche was built, getting expanded in 1954. Since its foundation it belonged to the Roman Catholic Archdiocese of Freiburg (deanery Kraichgau).

Jews are proved since the 16th century, although the municipality was not settled by them generally and the parish was quite poor and small. In 1802 there were five families living there, in 1825 there were six ones. In 1816 a new building failed financially. Later in 1843 a small one was able to be built. In 1881 a Jewish graveyard has been created along the road to Siegelsbach. The parish grew to 80 persons by 1875, but afterwards decreased heavily due to migration and emigration. In 1900 there were 46 Jews, in 1933 just ten. The parish broke up in 1937. During the pogrom in 1938 a shop window of a Jewish shop got destroyed. Four of the last five Jews living in Bad Rappenau were killed.

Incorporations
Following communal lands and villages had been introduced into Bad Rappenau. As far as not given otherwise they belonged to the district of Sinsheim until 1972. All of them came to the district of Heilbronn according to the district reform on January 1, 1973.

 April 1, 1950: Zimmerhof
 April 1, 1952: Zimmerhöferfeld
 January 1, 1971: Babstadt, Treschklingen
 January 1, 1972: Obergimpern, Wollenberg
 March 1, 1972: Heinsheim (district of Mosbach)
 January 1, 1973: Fürfeld (district of Heilbronn), Grombach
 November 1, 1973: Bonfeld (district of Heilbronn)

Development of population

1 results of censuses

Politics

District council

Following the municipal election of 25 May 2014, the district council of Bad Rappenau has 34 seats. The election result is as follows:

* In 2009, together with the FDP

Mayor
In the past the local lord appointed a bailiff (vogt) to administer the village of Rappenau. Later the Grand Duchy of Baden established a mayor to head the municipal administration assisted by a council. Being a Große Kreisstadt since 1 January 2003, the mayor has the title Oberbürgermeister. His deputy is called the Bürgermeister.

Bürgermeister and Oberbürgermeister

Arms and flag

Blazon: In gold on a blue sign a jumping black horse. The town colours are black and yellow.

The seal of Rappenau (1820) shows in blue two golden beams. The arms and flag were given by the ministry of the interior on September 26, 1957.

Twin towns – sister cities

Bad Rappenau is twinned with:
 Contrexéville, France (1982)
 Llandrindod Wells, Wales, United Kingdom (2001)

Culture and sights

Museums
Since 1989 Bad Rappenau has a museum showing the history of brine and bathing in the town.

Notable buildings

Next to the parish church there is the old town hall built in 1841 being the first one. Nearby the old town hall there is a fountain of 1928 having the inscription: Ruhe ist des Bürgers erste Pflicht - Im Wein liegt Wahrheit, im Wasser liegt Klarheit. - "The first citizen's duty is silence - In wine there is truth, in water there is clearness." In the town there is some old half-timbering, e. g. the Dominikanerhof. The station is a building of classicism in times of rail construction. 

On the urban cemetery lies Georg Christian Heinrich Rosentritt who discovered salt occurrences in 1822. There is also a war memorial.

Parks
Bad Rappenau has several parks at its disposal: the Schlosspark in the west around of the water castle and the Salinengarten including Hohenstadter Grund and Kurpark in the east.

From April 25 to October 5, 2008, the Landesgartenschau of Baden-Württemberg took place in Bad Rappenau. One of the main attractions was the graduation tower. The three parks have been connected and upgraded by this event.

Regular events
Since 1977 and 1978 there is the Straßenfest respectively Stadtfest; also a spring festival takes place. Since the 1980s and 1990s there are different festivals in other parts of the town, e. g. the Herbstfest and the Schlosshoffest in Grombach, the Fischerfest in Heinsheim, the Schlossfest in Obergimpern, the Kelterfest in Wollenberg and the Martinimarkt in Zimmerhof. Also there is the lightning festival taking more than 10,000 visitors to Bad Rappenau and having big success. An open-air festival also takes place.

Economy and infrastructure

Traffic
Bad Rappenau has a direct motorway point along the A 6 (Mannheim–Heilbronn). There is also the Bundesstraße B 39.

Bad Rappenau station is situated at the Elsenz Valley Railway running from Bad Friedrichshall to Heidelberg. Public transport is managed by Heilbronner Hohenloher Haller Nahverkehr.

Local businesses
Some of the biggest businesses are:

Kulimare Italian Restaurant.
Mondi Bad Rappenau GmbH, producer of packaging
ZIMA Apparate GmbH, producer of filter instruments
Stahl Plast Kunststoffe GmbH & Co.
Losberger Intertent GmbH, building constructor
EOS KSI Inkasso Deutschland GmbH, demand and credit management
Kraichgau-Klinik Bad Rappenau GmbH & Co.KG, rehabilitation centre of oncology
Vulpius Klinik GmbH, orthopaedic hospital
Kurklinik Bad Rappenau GmbH, management and business of hospitals
Häffner Bräu, brewery and restaurant
"Vesalius Klinik GmbH" psychosomatic hospital.

Media
The Kraichgau Stimme, part of the Heilbronner Stimme and the paper Bad Rappenauer Bote / Eppinger Nachrichten, part of the Rhein-Neckar-Zeitung) inform about happenings in Bad Rappenau.

Public institutions
In Bad Rappenau there is a notary's office.

Education
Bad Rappenau has a Realschule (Wilhelm-Hauff-Realschule), a Förderschule (Albert-Schweitzer-Schule), a Hauptschule with Werkrealschule and a Grundschule each in Bonfeld, Fürfeld, Grombach, Heinsheim, Obergimpern, Zimmerhof and a further one (Theodor-Heuss-Schule) responsible for Babstadt and Treschklingen. The urban library has more than 20,000 media at its disposal.

Notable people
 Carl Egler (1896–1982), in Karlsruhe, German sculptor
 Eberhard von Gemmingen (born 1936), head of the editorial office of Vatican Radio
 Klaus Zapf (1952–2014), entrepreneur, founder of Zapf Removals

References

External links
 
Das Bad im Blütenmeer Website of the Landesgartenschau 2008 in Bad Rappenau 

Heilbronn (district)
Spa towns in Germany
Holocaust locations in Germany
Populated places on the Neckar basin
Populated riverside places in Germany